The 1985 Oregon Ducks football team represented the University of Oregon in the 1985 NCAA Division I-A football season. Playing as a member of the Pacific-10 Conference (Pac-10), the team was led by head coach Rich Brooks, in his ninth year, and played their home games at Autzen Stadium in Eugene, Oregon. They finished the season with a record of five wins and six losses (5–6 overall, 3–4 in

Schedule

Game summaries

at Nebraska

vs. USC

Source:

NFL Draft
Three Ducks were selected in the 1986 NFL Draft, which lasted twelve rounds (335 selections).

References

Oregon
Oregon Ducks football seasons
Oregon Ducks football